Yuki Ikeda was a Japanese dissident who joined the Republic of China during the Second Sino-Japanese War. Ikeda was involved with the Christian reform movement of Toyohiko Kagawa, and anti-militarist activities. She fled to China, where she married Wataru Kaji. She fled Shanghai along with her husband, Wataru, when the Japanese invaded the city. She worked on the re-education program of Japanese prisoners of war in Chongqing.

During the war, Ikeda met journalist Edgar Snow and labor activist Koji Ariyoshi.

See also 
Japanese dissidence during the Shōwa period
Japanese in the Chinese resistance to the Empire of Japan
Japanese People's Emancipation League

References

Further reading
1973-06-25. 故池田幸子女史の歩んだ道: 日中戦争期における反戦運動 , Institute of Chinese Affairs, 304, pp. 23–35.

Female resistance members of World War II
People of the Second Sino-Japanese War
Japanese rebels